The Cyano-2 RNA motif is a conserved RNA structure identified by bioinformatics.  Cyano-2 RNAs are found in Cyanobacterial species classified within the genus Synechococcus.  Many terminal loops in the two conserved stem-loops contain the nucleotide sequence GCGA, and these sequences might in some cases form stable GNRA tetraloops.  Since the two stem-loops are somewhat distant from one another it is possible that they represent two independent non-coding RNAs that are often or always co-transcribed.  The region one thousand base pairs upstream of predicted Cyano-2 RNAs is usually devoid of annotated features such as RNA or protein-coding genes.  This absence of annotated genes within one thousand base pairs is relatively unusual within bacteria.

See also
Yfr1
Yfr2
Cyano-S1 RNA motif

References

External links
 

Non-coding RNA